The Bethpage Branch was a branch of the Long Island Rail Road (LIRR), running from the present-day split between the Ronkonkoma Branch and Central Branch (then called the Bethpage Junction and now called Bethpage Interlocking) north about  to present-day Old Bethpage, New York.

History
This branch was originally built by the Central Railroad of Long Island (CRRLI) in June 1873, primarily for the purpose of serving Alexander Turney Stewart's local brick manufacturing plant (Bethpage Brickworks), so he could deliver bricks for his project building the planned community of Garden City, New York. Several pickle factories near the brickyards also used the line to deliver their freight.

Though passenger usage was not part of the original plan, one passenger stop at each end of the branch was instituted. The passenger stop at the northern terminus of the branch was called Bethpage, located near present-day Winding Road and Battle Row (just north of the old Stewart brickworks, and south of the present-day Old Bethpage Village Restoration). The stop at the southern end, called Bethpage Junction, was also a transfer point. From Bethpage Junction CRRLI (replaced after 1876 by LIRR) trains went north to Bethpage, and southeast to Babylon and beyond. CRRLI (and later LIRR) trains went west towards Garden City (and beyond), while LIRR trains went west to Jamaica (and beyond), and east towards Ronkonkama (and beyond).

Proposals to extend the branch north through Huntington, Smithtown, and Port Jefferson were abandoned after amalgamation of the CRRLI with the LIRR in 1876. Designated a siding as of May 24, 1909, the Bethpage Branch was abandoned on November 10, 1942. Today, the former right-of-way in part is occupied by a bridle path and Thomas Powell Boulevard.

Stations

References

External links 

 1873 map showing railways on Long Island
 Bethpage Branch Track Maps by Bob Emery (Unofficial LIRR History)
 B-Tower May 11, 1947, April 24, 1966,  1986 and July 1993
 1952 Photo of Bethpage Junction
 The L.I.R.R.'s Bethpage Branch (Arrt's Archives)
 Bethpage Junction History (Arrt's Arrchives)
 Trains Are Fun: Bethpage
 Old Bethpage Village Restoration

Long Island Rail Road branches
Transportation in Nassau County, New York
Bethpage, New York
Railway lines opened in 1873
Railway lines closed in 1942